Athina Christoforaki (born 6 November 1980) is a Greek basketball player who competed in the 2004 Summer Olympics.

References

1980 births
Living people
Greek women's basketball players
Olympic basketball players of Greece
Basketball players at the 2004 Summer Olympics
Panathinaikos WBC players